Marino Promes (born 11 February 1977 in Haarlem) is a Dutch former professional footballer who played for Eerste Divisie and Eredivisie clubs HFC Haarlem, Willem II, De Graafschap and FC Zwolle between 1994 and 2004.

References

External links
voetbal international profile

1977 births
Living people
Dutch footballers
Footballers from Haarlem
Association football forwards
Eredivisie players
Eerste Divisie players
HFC Haarlem players
Willem II (football club) players
De Graafschap players
PEC Zwolle players